Myonycteris (collared bat) is a genus of bat in the family Pteropodidae.

It contains the following species:

Genus Myonycteris
 São Tomé collared fruit bat, Myonycteris brachycephala
 East African little collared fruit bat, Myonycteris relicta
 Little collared fruit bat, Myonycteris torquata

References

Literature cited
Simmons, N.B. 2005. Order Chiroptera. Pp. 312–529 in Wilson, D.E. and Reeder, D.M. (eds.). Mammal Species of the World: a taxonomic and geographic reference. 3rd ed. Baltimore: The Johns Hopkins University Press, 2 vols., 2142 pp. 

 
Bat genera
Taxa named by Paul Matschie
Taxonomy articles created by Polbot